Mourad Bounoua (born 30 July 1972) is a former professional footballer who played as a midfielder during the 1990s and 2000s. He spent most of his career in Germany. Born in France, he made one appearance for the Morocco national team in 1998.

Career
Born in Mulhouse, Bounoua began playing professionally with his local team FC Mulhouse in 1991 but did not quite make the grade and was sold to Swiss Second Division team FC Basel in 1992. During his two years in Basel he did not play a single league match but made five appearances for the team in the Swiss Cup. In 1994, he moved to Germany with Tus Hoisdorf. He then signed for TuS Celle FC in 1995, where he played for two years before joining Stuttgarter Kickers. He achieved some excellent form in Stuttgart and was called up to the Morocco national team. Eintracht Frankfurt signed him in 1998, but he struggled there, playing just seven games, and moved on to Hannover 96 a year later. Bounoua signed for FC St. Pauli in 2002 and spent the rest of his career in the German lower divisions with multiple clubs in Northern Germany, before retiring in the summer of 2012.

References

External links
 
 

1972 births
Living people
Footballers from Mulhouse
Association football midfielders
French footballers
Moroccan footballers
Morocco international footballers
French sportspeople of Moroccan descent
FC Mulhouse players
FC Basel players
Stuttgarter Kickers players
Eintracht Frankfurt players
Hannover 96 players
FC St. Pauli players
TuS Celle FC players
TuS Hoisdorf players
FC Oberneuland players
Rotenburger SV players
Bundesliga players
2. Bundesliga players
French expatriate footballers
French expatriate sportspeople in Switzerland
Moroccan expatriate sportspeople in Switzerland
French expatriate sportspeople in Germany
Moroccan expatriate footballers
Expatriate footballers in Germany